APTA or Apta can refer to:

9393 Apta, a main-belt asteroid discovered on August 10, 1994
Apta, the name of Opatów, Poland, in Yiddish
Apta (Hasidic dynasty), originated in  Opatów
a brand of cleaning products

Documents
Automotive Products Trade Agreement
Asia-Pacific Trade Agreement

Organizations
Ajax Pickering Transit Authority, a former transit operator in Pickering and Ajax, Ontario, merged into Durham Region Transit in 2006
All Primary Teachers Association
American Physical Therapy Association
American Public Transportation Association, an industry organization for transportation providers in the United States